St. Catherine's Taffy is a variety of taffy made by French-Canadian families to celebrate the feast day of Saint Catherine of Alexandria, which takes place annually on November 25.

Origins
St. Catherine's Taffy is a candy made by girls in French-Canadian families to honour St. Catherine, the patron saint of unmarried women on her feast day, November 25. St. Catherine's day is sometimes known in Franco Canadian families as "taffy day," a day when marriage-age girls would make taffy for eligible boys. Marguerite Bourgeoys, a founder of the Notre-Dame de Montréal and an early teacher at Ville-Marie, the colonial settlement that would later become Montreal, is credited with starting the tradition as a way of keeping the attention of her young students.

See also 
 Catherinette

References

External links
St. Catherine's taffy recipe

Holiday foods
Cuisine of Quebec
Canadian confectionery
Religious food and drink